Center Party is a registered political party in Norway. The party was established by several former county leaders from the Christian Democratic Party, defectors from the Socialist Left Party, the Labour Party, the Conservative Party and the Green Party, as well as former city councilor for the Labour Party in Oslo Geir Lippestad. The party's youth organization is Unge Sentrum.

In the party platform, the party has decided to be a bloc-independent center party based on the UN's Sustainable Development Goals and the Universal Declaration of Human Rights. The party wanted a change of government after the 2021 Norwegian parliamentary election. The party received 0.3% of the votes in the elections.

Opinion polls 
In December 2020, the party secured enough signatures to run lists in all counties for the 2021 parliamentary election. The Center Party was measured in opinion polls in the winter of 2020/21 between 0.0 and 0.7 per cent support.

In the spring of 2021, Norstat conducted a nationwide survey commissioned by the Center Party, to answer how the party fared before the parliamentary elections in 2021. 2% of the 1,000 respondents answered "yes" to the question of whether they considered voting for the party in the autumn elections. 9% answered "maybe", and 13% answered "do not know".

Electoral results

References

External links 
 official site  

Christian democratic parties in Norway
Political parties established in 2020
2020 establishments in Norway